İğneada (Greek: Thynias) is a small town within the district of Demirköy in Turkey's Kırklareli Province. Its population was 1,966 in 2010.

The land is covered by mainly oak forests, typical flora of the Yıldız (Istranca) Mountains. Forestry, fishing and tourism are the main occupations of the town population.

The İğneada Floodplain Forests National Park with its Lake Saka Nature Reserve Area is situated around the town. It harbors one of the few remaining floodplain forests in all of Europe, which is home to many different bird species.

The second of Turkey's nuclear power plants is planned to be built in the area. A fourth revision environmental impact assessment was submitted and approved. There is no timeline or budget set for the project as of November 2015.

References

External links

 Kırklareli governor's official website 
 İğneada municipality's official website 
 İğneada website 

Populated coastal places in Turkey
Populated places in Kırklareli Province
Seaside resorts in Turkey
Fishing communities in Turkey
Towns in Turkey
Demirköy District

 https://web.archive.org/web/20130715092150/http://www.panoramio.com/photo_explorer#view=list&position=306&with_photo_id=25331634&order=date_desc&user=2616021